Dinus de Rossonis or Mugellanus was an Italian jurist of the late 13th century.

He studied civil law at Bologna University up until 1278 before teaching law at Pistoia (1279–1284) and Bologna (1284–96), where he taught Cino da Pistoia and where he is recorded in 1289 as the first civil law teacher to draw a salary.

In 1296, he appears to have joined the clergy and his wife a nunnery. In Rome, he taught at the papal school. He may have helped prepare the Liber Sextus, Pope Boniface VIII's third volume of the Canon Code, which he later wrote a commentary on. He is last recorded in Bologna in 1298.

Works 

 Super infortatio et digesto novo, Bologna, 1971.
 Commentarii in regulas juris, Coloniae, 1617.
 Consilia,.., Lugduni, 1551.
 
 Tractatus de interesse, 1549.
 Tractatus de glossis cotrariis, 1549.
 Tractatus authenticus des successionibus ab intestato, 1549.
 De regulis juri,.., Lugduni, 1533.
 Preclarus insignis tractatus..., 1527.
 Rubrice totius juris canonici et civilis, J. Petit, 1512.
 Ordo judiciorum

References

13th-century Italian jurists
Year of death unknown
Year of birth unknown
Academic staff of the University of Bologna